Louis Smith may refer to:

 Louis Smith (Australian politician) (1830–1910), member of the Victorian Legislative Assembly
 Louis Smith (British politician) (1879–1939), British Conservative Party politician
 Louis Carter Smith (1870–1961), archery champion and historian
 Louis Laybourne Smith (1880–1965), Australian architect
 Lou Smith (1928–2007), American singer
 Louis Smith (musician) (1931–2016), American jazz trumpeter
 Louis Smith (gymnast) (born 1989), British gymnast
 Louis S. Smith II, co-founder of Shindana Toys
 Louis Smith Tainter, for whom the Louis Smith Tainter House is named after

See also

Lewis Smith (disambiguation)